Chen Clan Academy Station is an interchange station between Line 1 and Line 8 of the Guangzhou Metro. It started operations on 28June 1999 and is situated underground Zhongshan 7th Road in the Liwan District. The station was named after the nearby Chen Clan Academy, an academy constructed by the Chen family for their juniors' accommodation and study in Guangzhou during the Qing Dynasty (16441911).

Station layout

References

Railway stations in China opened in 1999
Guangzhou Metro stations in Liwan District